Hypotacha retracta is a species of moth in the family Erebidae. It is found in Angola, Botswana, Namibia, Somalia, South Africa (Eastern Cape, KwaZulu-Natal) and Uganda.

Subspecies
Hypotacha retracta retracta
Hypotacha retracta waterbergensis Kühne, 2004 (Namibia: Waterberg)

References

Moths described in 1902
Hypotacha
Moths of Africa